Jackson Inlet is a body of water in Nunavut's Qikiqtaaluk Region. It lies east of Lancaster Sound and cuts into Baffin Island's Brodeur Peninsula.

Mining

The inlet and surrounding area has been explored for diamonds and other potential mining resources.

References

Inlets of Baffin Island